Paraíso is a Venezuelan telenovela produced and broadcast in 1989 by Venevisión. The novela was written by Vivel Novel and starred Amanda Gutiérrez and Víctor Cámara as the main protagonists with Belén Marrero and Mariano Alvarez as the main antagonists.

Cast
Amanda Gutiérrez as Eva Julieta
Víctor Cámara as Adrian Arturo
Belen Marrero as Fedora
Carlos Arreaza as Piraña
Janín Barboza 
Mirella Larotonda as Tane
Mariano Álvarez

References

External links
 

1989 telenovelas
Venevisión telenovelas
Spanish-language telenovelas
Venezuelan telenovelas
1989 Venezuelan television series debuts
1990 Venezuelan television series endings
Television shows set in Venezuela